Jesse Stone (1901–1999) was an American musician and songwriter, also known as Charles Calhoun. Jesse Stone may also refer to:

Politicians and public officials
Jesse Stone (Wisconsin politician) (born 1836), Lieutenant Governor of Wisconsin from 1899 to 1903
Jesse Stone (Georgia politician) (born 1956), state senator from Georgia (U.S. state)
Jesse N. Stone (1932–2001), civil rights attorney and judge in Louisiana and president of the Southern University System from 1974 to 1985

Fiction
Jesse Stone (character), protagonist in a series of novels by Robert B. Parker.
Films (starring Tom Selleck) based on those novels are in sequential order:

 Jesse Stone: Night Passage (2006)
 Jesse Stone: Stone Cold (2005)
 Jesse Stone: Death in Paradise (2006)
 Jesse Stone: Sea Change (2007)
 Jesse Stone: Thin Ice (2009)
 Jesse Stone: No Remorse (2010)
 Jesse Stone: Innocents Lost (2011)
 Jesse Stone: Benefit of the Doubt (2012) 
 Jesse Stone: Lost in Paradise (2015)